"You and I" is the debut single by R&B/funk musician Rick James, released in 1978 from his debut album, Come Get It!. It spent two weeks at number one on the Billboard R&B charts and reached number thirteen on the Billboard Hot 100. "You and I" also peaked at number three on the disco chart.

Personnel
Rick James - vocals, keyboards, synthesizers
Levi Ruffin, Jr. - keyboards
Billy Nunn – keyboards
Bobby Nunn – keyboards
Freddie Rappilo – guitar
Andy Rapillo – bass
Richard Shaw – bass
Lorenzo Shaw – drums
Mike Caputy – drums
Randy and Mike Brecker – horns
Flick, Berry, Steve Williams - horns
Levi and Jackie Ruffin, Bobby and Billy Nunn, Sascha Meeks, Richard Shaw, Vanessa Brooks Nunn, Joey Diggs, Anthony Ceasar, Roger Brown, Calvin Moore, Bennie McCullough - background vocals
 Art Stewart - co-producer

References

External links
 

1978 songs
1978 debut singles
Rick James songs
Songs written by Rick James
Gordy Records singles
Song recordings produced by Art Stewart
Song recordings produced by Rick James